Skirnir Mountains is a group of nunataks in the King Frederick VI Coast, Sermersooq municipality, SE Greenland.
The range is named after Skírnir, the messenger of god Freyr in Norse mythology.

Geography
The Skirnir Mountains are a range of nunataks that rises to the west, between the Heimdal and Garm glaciers, west of the inner area of the Sehested Fjord.

See also
List of mountain ranges of Greenland
List of nunataks

References

External links
Images - Sehested Fjord (Greenland)

Skirnir
Sermersooq